Gheorghe Dima National Music Academy is an educational institution located in Cluj-Napoca, Romania. The institution was founded in 1919, and currently comprises various departments including composition, conducting, musicology, musical pedagogy, canto, choreographic pedagogy, and opera. Notable alumni include Christian Wilhelm Berger, Gheorghe Ciobanu, Boldizsár Csiky, Tiberiu Olah, Anita Hartig, Mariana Nicolesco, and Adela Zaharia.

See also 
 List of universities in Romania

External links
Official website - Romanian
Official website - English

Gheorghe Dima Music Academy
Music schools in Romania
Educational institutions established in 1919
1919 establishments in Romania